The Wadi Wishka Dam is a concrete-face rock-fill embankment dam located on Wadi Wishka,  southwest of Sokna in the Fezzan region of Libya. The primary purpose of the dam is flood control and water. Construction on the dam began in 2004 and it was completed in 2006 at a cost of US$5 million.

References

Wishka
Concrete-face rock-fill dams
Fezzan
Dams completed in 2006
2006 establishments in Africa
2000s establishments in Libya